The Queen's Personal New Zealand Flag was the personal flag of Queen Elizabeth II in her role as Queen of New Zealand. It was approved for use in 1962, and was used by the Queen when she was in New Zealand. The Queen’s Representative, the Governor-General of New Zealand, used a separate flag.

Background
On 11 October 1962 the then Queen announced the adoption of a special personal flag for use on her tour of New Zealand between 6–18 February 1963 and for use until her death in 2022.

Description

The flag follows the same basic pattern used by the then Queen across several other realms since the 1960s: it is the escutcheon of a country's coat of arms (e.g. the arms of New Zealand) in banner form defaced with a device taken from her personal flag (a blue roundel surrounded by a garland of roses encircling a crowned letter 'E', all in gold).

The flag is divided into four quadrants: The first quadrant includes depicts four stars as representative of the Southern Cross constellation, as depicted on the national flag. The second quadrant consists of a golden fleece on a red field. The third quadrant contains a golden wheat sheaf on a red field. The final quadrant includes two crossed gold hammers on a blue field.

The central stripe consists of three ships. Superimposed in the centre is a dark blue roundel bearing a Roman E surmounted by a Royal Crown within a chaplet of roses, all gold-coloured, obscuring the centre ship.

The central blue disc is taken from the then Queen's Personal Flag, which was used by the Queen in relation to her role as Head of the Commonwealth.

Usage and protocol

The flag was flown continuously on any building in which the Queen was in residence and by a ship transporting the Queen in New Zealand waters. It was also flown whilst the Queen was attending a state or public function, and it could be seen above the saluting base at military parades and open air gatherings when she was present. It was also broken when the Queen set foot on board one of Her Majesty's New Zealand Ships.

When flown with the New Zealand Flag, the Queen's Personal Flag for New Zealand took the position of honour.

The only occasions on which the Queen's Personal Flag for New Zealand was flown in her absence was at parades in honour of Her Majesty's Official Birthday. The flag was also paraded at the New Zealand State Memorial Service following the Queen's death.

Legal
The flag is protected under the Flags, Emblems, and Names Protection Act 1981, Section 12(1) states:

According to Section 12(2)(c), this applies to, among others, "any representation of the Royal Standard, or the Sovereign’s personal flag for New Zealand".

Coronation Standard

During the coronation ceremony of the monarch at Westminster Abbey, the "standards" of various countries are carried by various officials in the procession inside the abbey. These flags are the country's coat of arms as a banner of arms. For New Zealand, unlike Canada and Australia, the banner remained the same for the King George V, King George VI and Queen Elizabeth II in 1911, 1937, and 1953, respectively.. The banner was in a 3:4 ratio and without defacement.

See also
Flags of Elizabeth II — for a full list of all of Queen Elizabeth II's flags
List of New Zealand flags
Queen's Personal Australian Flag 
Queen's Personal Canadian Flag
Flag of the Governor-General of New Zealand

References

Flags, Emblems, and Names Protection Act 1981 legislation.govt.nz

 
Monarchy in New Zealand
New Zealand
Southern Cross flags